Adolphus Wolgast (February 8, 1888 - April 14, 1955), nicknamed Michigan Wildcat, was the world's lightweight champion from 1910 to 1912.

Biography
Wolgast's siblings were fellow boxers Johnny Wolgast and Al Wolgast.

Wolgast trained on a meat-based diet. He was fond of eating steak and opposed the vegetarian diet of rival lightweight boxing champion Freddie Welsh.

World lightweight champion

He turned professional in 1906, and on 22 February 1910 he won the World Lightweight Title with a technical knockout (TKO) during a 40-round bout with Battling Nelson.  After the California bout, both fighters were arrested and charged with violating the anti-prizefighting law.  Wolgast would later defend the title against Mexican Joe Rivers in 1912, a bout that caused controversy. Delivering simultaneous blows, they knocked each other out. Referee Jack Welch counted to ten and the bout was over. However, he awarded the win to Wolgast, claiming that Ad had started to rise before the fatal ten. Rivers' fans let out a roar, believing he had been fouled. To add to the confusion, the timekeeper insisted the round had ended when Welch reached the count of four. But Welch's ruling became the official verdict. Wolgast ultimately defended the belt five times before losing it to Willie Ritchie in 1912.

Later life
Wolgast was declared incompetent in 1917 and a guardianship was established for him. He suffered a nervous breakdown in 1918 and was placed in a sanitarium. He escaped and was later found living in the "North Woods" of California as a "mountain man." In December 1918 a Los Angeles court found him competent to handle his own affairs, and terminated the guardianship.

In the early 1920s, Jack Doyle, owner of a Vernon, California boxing venue, took Wolgast "under his wing," and allowed him to train at his boxing gym, although Wolgast was not to fight again.

Death
In 1927 he was committed to Stockton State Hospitalwhere he remained for the rest of his life. He died 14 April 1955 in Camarillo, California of heart complications.

Professional boxing record
All information in this section is derived from BoxRec, unless otherwise stated.

Official record

All newspaper decisions are officially regarded as “no decision” bouts and are not counted to the win/loss/draw column.

Unofficial record

Record with the inclusion of newspaper decisions to the win/loss/draw column.

See also
Lineal championship

References

External links
 
Adolph Wolgast at Flickr
CBZ page
Ad Wolgast at Find a Grave

1888 births
1955 deaths
World lightweight boxing champions
International Boxing Hall of Fame inductees
Boxers from Michigan
American male boxers
Burials at Forest Lawn Memorial Park (Hollywood Hills)